Morton A. "Mort" Klein (born 1947) is a German-born American economist, statistician, and pro-Israeli activist. He is the president of the Zionist Organization of America. In 2004, he was named one of the top five Jewish leaders in the United States by The Forward.

Klein is a published academic, having served as a lecturer at Temple University and as a biostatistician at the UCLA Fielding School of Public Health and the Linus Pauling Institute.

Early life and career 
Klein was born to Holocaust survivors in a displaced persons camp in Günzburg, Germany. At age four, he and his family emigrated from Germany to the United States, where he would grow up in South Philadelphia.

His father was a Satmar chasid, an Orthodox Rabbi with semicha from Moshe Teitelbaum. Klein said in a Jewish Press interview regarding his father that "In Europe he had a long beard and black hat and was a rosh yeshiva in his early 20s. But he disagreed with the Satmars on Israel. My father loved Israel, so obviously this was transmitted to me."

Klein served as an economist under presidents Richard Nixon, Gerald Ford, and Jimmy Carter. He has served as a biostatistician at UCLA School of Public Health and the Linus Pauling Institute of Science and Medicine in Palo Alto, Calif. He has been a lecturer in mathematics and statistics at Temple University. Today, Klein is member of the International Board of Governors of the Ariel University Center of Samaria.

He was dismayed by the 1993 signing of the Oslo Accords, choosing to begin pro-Israel work in response: "I only went into the work because I thought Oslo was a disastrous mistake and I wanted a podium to express that. I did not intend to do it for more than a year or two, make my case and then go back to normal life. But things kept getting worse, not better."

Zionist Organization of America
In 1993, while serving as the Philadelphia chapter president of the Zionist Organization of America, Klein was elected national president. He is credited for converting it from a moribund group to a high-profile, outspoken organization. After the Obama administration abstained from using its veto power to block United Nations Security Council Resolution 2334 which stated that Israeli Settlement in the West Bank is a "flagrant" violation of international law, Klein called Obama "a Jew-hating antisemite."

Klein has stated his belief that the U.S. should engage in religious profiling of Muslims. "In an era in which the vast majority of terrorism is committed by Muslims, in order to protect American citizens, we should adopt the same profiling policies as Israel and be more thorough in vetting Muslims," he told The Forward. Klein said he would also support profiling of Jews under certain circumstances. "If most terror were committed by Jews I would support profiling Jews."

In February 2012, the ZOA lost its tax-exempt status from the Internal Revenue Service after it failed to file tax returns for three years. The ZOA regained its status in May 2013. Klein said it was a technical "glitch." During the years that the ZOA failed to file tax returns, The Forward reported that Klein's salary increased 38%. In 2014, Steven Goldberg, a Los Angeles attorney and national vice-president of the ZOA, launched a challenge to Klein's presidency, alleging that Klein was mismanaging the ZOA and personally profiting. Klein was later reelected president with 93% of the vote.

Through his work with the ZOA, Klein was named one of the top dozen "Jewish activists of the century." The New York Jewish Week, the largest Federation paper, has named him one of the top ten Jewish leaders who have "made a difference". The Jewish Press stated that "Morton Klein is one of the best minds in this country."

Through the ZOA, Klein has taken issue with comments by Democratic Congresswoman Alexandria Ocasio-Cortez which appropriated the phrase "never again". Klein stated: "AOC's ludicrous statements that the U.S. has a 'Fascist' 'presidency that creates concentration camps' to hold immigrant communities, and AOC's invocation of the Holocaust-associated slogan 'never again' with respect to the housing of immigrant minors – are abhorrent insults to the memory of the 6 million Jews and the millions of gays, gypsies, and others who were intentionally slaughtered, worked to death, starved, gassed and tortured in the real Nazi-Fascist concentration camps." Klein has also called for Rashida Tlaib to be removed from Democratic Party for what he views as antisemitic comments.

In November 2022, after Donald Trump had dinner with Kanye West and Nick Fuentes, Klein said "I have become very frightened for my people... Donald Trump is not an antisemite. He loves Israel. He loves Jews. But he mainstreams, he legitimizes Jew hatred and Jew haters. And this scares me."

Opposition to the Boycott, Divestment, and Sanctions movement
Klein is an active voice against the Boycott, Divestment and Sanctions movement against Israel, once speaking on the issue in an address to the Israeli Knesset.

Qatar controversy
On June 19, 2018, Mother Jones reported that Qatar had donated $100,000 to the ZOA through lobbyist Joey Allaham. Allaham first contributed $50,000 to the ZOA on November 2, 2017, shortly before the group's annual gala on November 17 in which former Qatari diplomat Ahmed Al-Rumaihi was present, at the invitation of Allaham. The second $50,000 contribution from Allaham to the ZOA came on January 23, 2018, a few weeks after Klein visited Doha. Klein had been under the impression that the money came from Allaham's personal finances and had ZOA return the funds when it was discovered otherwise.

Natalie Portman, "beautiful" but not "too bright"
In April 2018, Klein tweeted: "Natalie Portman's absurd, uninformed, inaccurate, dangerous views on Israel, while ignoring the anti-Semitic, pro-terrorist views/actions of Hamas and the Palestinian Authority gives credibility and legitimacy to the ludicrous, false, nonsensical belief that beautiful women aren't too bright." Portman had refused to accept the Genesis Prize in Israel, protesting the killing of Palestinian demonstrators on the Gaza Strip border. Klein was accused of misogyny. He first dismissed the criticism by citing an "attractive and smart" female staffer, but later apologised for his comments.

Use of anti-Arab slur
Klein was the target of condemnation in September 2018 for using the term "filthy Arabs" on Twitter. He has stood by his comment.

Opposition to Black Lives Matter
Klein made a series of tweets in June 2020 condemning Black Lives Matter as "a Jew hating, White hating, Israel hating, conservative Black hating, violence promoting, dangerous Soros funded extremist group of haters." In the context of the widespread protests following the police murder of George Floyd, the statements put Klein in conflict with more liberal Jewish groups. Rabbi Rick Jacobs, the president of the Union for Reform Judaism, questioned the continued membership of ZOA in the Conference of Major American Jewish Organizations by saying "we are now implicated by his views, his Islamophobia, his racism, full stop."

Barack Obama's birthplace
In a 2022 interview with the New Yorker, Klein defended President Trump's promotion of conspiracy theories questioning the birthplace of Barack Obama, claiming that Obama's autobiography cover jacket stated he was born in Kenya. Klein further stated that it was "very suspicious" that President Barack Obama did not release his birth certificate "when it was being challenged." Obama released his long-form birth certificate in 2011, confirming that he was born in Hawaii, while Obama's publishers released promotional material in 1991 misstating Obama's birthplace. Klein later clarified he believed that Barack Obama was born in the United States.

Conflict with Rutgers
On September 11, 2018, it was reported in The New York Times that Kenneth L. Marcus, the assistant secretary of education for civil rights reopened a seven-year-old case brought by the ZOA against Rutgers University, saying the Obama administration, in closing the case, ignored evidence that suggested the school allowed a hostile environment for Jewish students. Klein is quoted in the story stating: “Hate groups like Students for Justice in Palestine try to convince others that their attacks on Zionism and Israel are legitimate political discourse. But as the State Department definition of anti-Semitism recognizes, these attacks are often a mask for Jew-hatred, plain and simple.”

Personal
Klein is married to Rita, has a married daughter Rachael, and four grandchildren. Klein has Tourette syndrome.

Testimony before government committees 
In 2017, Klein submitted a letter to Congress which stated that "moving the U.S. Embassy to Israel's capital will achieve tremendous benefits for the United States and our allies throughout the world."

Academic work 
Klein served as a lecturer at Temple University and as a biostatistician at UCLA School of Public Health and the Linus Pauling Institute of Science and Medicine in Palo Alto, California. He has previously published work on epidemiology in academic journals. His research on nutrition and heart disease was cited by Discover Magazine as one of the Top 50 Scientific Studies of 1992.

References

External links
Zionist Organization of America official site

Living people
21st-century American economists
American people of German-Jewish descent
American political activists
American statisticians
American Zionists
Ariel University
Carter administration personnel
Critics of Black Lives Matter
Ford administration personnel
German emigrants to the United States
20th-century German Jews
Jewish American activists
Nixon administration personnel
People with Tourette syndrome
Leaders of organizations
University of California, Los Angeles faculty
Temple University faculty
New Right (United States)
1947 births